Richard Timothy Jones (born January 16, 1972) is an American actor. He has worked extensively in both film and television productions since the early 1990s. His television roles include Ally McBeal (1997), Judging Amy (1998–2005), CSI: Miami (2006), Girlfriends (2007), Grey's Anatomy (2010), Hawaii Five-0 (2011–2014), Narcos (2015), and Criminal Minds (2017). Since 2018, he has played Sergeant Wade Grey on the ABC police drama The Rookie.

His film roles include portrayals of Lamont Carr in Disney's Full Court Miracle (2003), Laveinio "Slim" Hightower in Rick Famuyiwa's coming-of-age film The Wood (1999), Mike in Tyler Perry's dramatic films Why Did I Get Married? (2007) and Why Did I Get Married Too? (2010), and Captain Russell Hampton in the Hollywood blockbuster Godzilla (2014).

Early life
Jones was born in Kobe, Japan, to American parents and grew up in Carson, California. He is the son of Lorene, a computer analyst, and Clarence Jones, a professional baseball player who at the time of Jones' birth was playing for the Nankai Hawks in Osaka. He has an older brother, Clarence Jones Jr., who works as a high school basketball coach. They would return to North America after Clarence's retirement following the 1978 season. His parents later divorced. Jones attended Bishop Montgomery High School in Torrance, California, then graduated from Tuskegee University.

Career 
Since the early 1990s, Jones has worked in both film and television productions.

His first television role was in a 1993 episode of the series California Dreams. That same year, he appeared as Ike Turner, Jr. in What's Love Got to Do with It. From 1999 to 2005, he starred as Bruce Calvin van Exel in the CBS legal drama series Judging Amy.

Over the next two decades, Jones starred or guest-starred in high-profile television series such as Ally McBeal (1997), CSI: Miami (2006), Girlfriends (2007), Grey's Anatomy (2010), Hawaii Five-0 (2011–2014), Narcos (2015), and Criminal Minds (2017).

His film roles include portrayals of Lamont Carr in the Disney film Full Court Miracle (2003), Laveinio "Slim" Hightower in Rick Famuyiwa's coming-of-age film The Wood (1999), and Mike in Tyler Perry's dramatic films Why Did I Get Married? (2007) and Why Did I Get Married Too? (2010), and Captain Russell Hampton in the Hollywood blockbuster Godzilla (2014).

From 2017 to 2018, Jones played Detective Tommy Cavanaugh in the CBS drama series Wisdom of the Crowd.

Since February 2018, Jones has played the role of Sergeant Wade Gray in the ABC police procedural drama series The Rookie with Nathan Fillion.

Personal life
Joshua Media Ministries claims that its leader, David E. Taylor, mentors Jones in ministry, and that Jones has donated $1 million to its efforts.

Filmography

Film

Television

References

External links
 

1972 births
African-American male actors
American expatriates in Japan
American male film actors
American male television actors
Living people
Male actors from California
People from Carson, California
People from Kobe
Actors from Kobe
21st-century African-American people
20th-century African-American people